Shoulder Mountain is a prominent, triangular rock buttress over 1,000 m, on the north side of the lower Fry Glacier and close south of Mount Creak in Victoria Land. It was mapped and given this descriptive name by the 1957 New Zealand Northern Survey Party of the Commonwealth Trans-Antarctic Expedition, 1956–58.

Mountains of Victoria Land
Scott Coast